Conganage Edmond Basil Anthony (11 August 1937 – 16 April 2014) was a Sri Lankan cricket umpire. He stood in one Test match in 1983 and two ODI games between 1982 and 1983.

See also
 List of Test cricket umpires
 List of One Day International cricket umpires

References

1937 births
2014 deaths
Sportspeople from Colombo
Sri Lankan Test cricket umpires
Sri Lankan One Day International cricket umpires